The Teatro Sangiorgi or Sangiorgi Theater is a cinematography, song, and drama stage located on Via Antonino di Sangiuliano #233 of central Catania, region of Sicily, Italy. It was erected in 1900, across the street from the Palazzo Manganelli, and designed in a Liberty style (Italian Art Nouveau). It is presently owned by the same entity as the Teatro Massimo Bellini.

History and Description 
When it was inaugurated in 1900 as mainly a stage for live opera during a summer season, the complex included a cafe, restaurant, and even a small hotel. The opening performance was La bohème di Giacomo Puccini. It was commissioned by Mario Sangiorgi to serve a lighter open air fare and entertainment than the opulent Teatro Massimo Bellini. By 1906, the theater was screening cinema projections. The theater was not roofed till 1907, and further decoration was provided in the atrium by the painter Salvatore De Gregorio.

The fortunes of the theater declined, and by the 1960s the theater remained closed until 2002, when it underwent restoration and commissioned the theater as an alternate hall for the Teatro Bellini. It also stages performances for younger audiences.

References
Mainly translated from Italian Wikipedia entry
Entry on history in Teatro Massimo Bellini website.

Theatres in Sicily
Buildings and structures in Catania
Sangiorgi
Art Nouveau architecture in Italy
Theatres completed in 1900
1900 establishments in Italy
19th-century architecture in Italy